Brian Lake (né Harris; 27 February 1982) is a former professional Australian rules footballer who played for the Western Bulldogs and Hawthorn Football Club in the Australian Football League (AFL).  He now plays for his local club Caroline Springs in the Western Region Football League, who won their first premiership in 2016.

Early career
Picked late in the 2001 AFL Draft at pick 71 from Woodville West-Torrens due to a sleep apnea condition that resulted in him falling asleep in club interviews; the Bulldogs discovered this and realised they could get him as late as they wished. Lake was a relatively late developer. Making his AFL debut late in the 2002 season, he was seen as a raw full-back who was some way from fully developing.

AFL career

Western Bulldogs

By the 2005 season, Lake's role in blanketing some of the best full-forwards in the game was seen as outstanding. He had come of age and shown significant improvement, much like many other of his Western Bulldogs teammates (such as Daniel Giansiracusa, Robert Murphy and Dale Morris), who led the team to within half a game of a finals' berth.

In round three, 2006, Lake was responsible for the hamstring injury that ended the season of 's Matthew Lloyd, when he landed on him midway through the third quarter of the teams' clash at Marvel Stadium.

In 2007 he developed into one of the leading full-backs in the competition and is remembered for the match against St Kilda in which he held Fraser Gehrig, a dual-Coleman Medal winner, to no possessions for the entire match. That year he won the Charles Sutton Medal as the Bulldogs' best and fairest player.

Lake earned a place in the 2009 AFL All-Australian team in the back pocket as his first All-Australian honour. In season 2010, he was again named in the 2010 AFL All-Australian at full back. Lake has often been referred by many commentators as a "defensive monster" due to his ability to out strength his opponent and take the mark in contested situations.

Hawthorn

Lake, along with pick 27, were traded to the Hawthorn Football Club at the end of the 2012 season during the trade period, in return for picks 21 and 41. The trade on the first day of trade week had caught many sport commentators by surprise that a deal was done so quickly. While the rest of the Hawthorn playing group were away on holidays, Lake trained at Waverley and lost 5 kilos before the team returned for pre-season training. A corked thigh caused him to delay his debut for his new club until round 5 against .

Lake's move to Hawthorn culminated in his first AFL premiership, with Hawthorn defeating  and Lake winning the Norm Smith Medal for best on ground. Lake played 21 games in his first season as a Hawk, his two goals were kicked against  in consecutive weeks. In 2014 Lake was involved in an on field incident with North Melbourne's Drew Petrie during their teams' Round 16 match. Lake was seen holding Petrie in a strangle-like position on the ground for an extended period of a time before Petrie's teammates dragged Lake away. Lake was charged with misconduct by the AFL Match Review Panel and referred straight to the AFL Tribunal for determination. Lake went on to win 2 more AFL premierships with Hawthorn in 2014 and 2015, playing a pivotal role in Hawthorn's success. This era is the first time Hawthorn have ever won 3 successive premierships in its history. Lake announced his retirement on 6 October 2015 after playing his last game for Hawthorn in the 2015 AFL Grand Final and winning his 3rd AFL premiership.

Criminal history
In January 2013, Lake and his then wife were locked up for four hours after a drunken altercation following the Portsea Polo. In July 2018, Lake spent five nights in a Japanese prison after being arrested after a drunken bar fight in Osaka. On 4 April 2019, Lake was arrested and charged with a series of offences including theft, criminal damage, stalking and entering a place likely to cause a breach of peace.

Personal life
At Christmas 2007 he legally changed his name from "Brian Harris" to "Brian Lake" in order to continue his father's family name. Lake currently resides in Caroline Springs, a suburb in Melbourne's west. He was a contestant on Australian Survivor: Champions vs. Contenders, ultimately coming in third place.

Statistics

|-  
| 2002 ||  || 36
| 1 || 0 || 0 || 1 || 1 || 2 || 1 || 0 || 0.0 || 0.0 || 1.0 || 1.0 || 2.0 || 1.0 || 0.0 || 0
|- 
| 2003 ||  || 36
| 13 || 6 || 7 || 44 || 31 || 75 || 23 || 19 || 0.5 || 0.5 || 3.4 || 2.4 || 5.8 || 1.8 || 1.5 || 0
|-  
| 2004 ||  || 36
| 17 || 0 || 0 || 72 || 40 || 112 || 47 || 18 || 0.0 || 0.0 || 4.2 || 2.4 || 6.6 || 2.8 || 1.1 || 0
|- 
| 2005 ||  || 36
| 22 || 2 || 1 || 150 || 81 || 231 || 85 || 26 || 0.1 || 0.0 || 6.8 || 3.7 || 10.5 || 3.9 || 1.2 || 0
|- 
| 2006 ||  || 36
| 24 || 1 || 0 || 177 || 127 || 304 || 123 || 49 || 0.0 || 0.0 || 7.4 || 5.3 || 12.7 || 5.1 || 2.0 || 0
|- 
| 2007 ||  || 36
| 20 || 0 || 1 || 237 || 106 || 343 || 182 || 35 || 0.0 || 0.1 || 11.9 || 5.3 || 17.2 || 9.1 || 1 || 2
|-  
| 2008 ||  || 36
| 25 || 4 || 2 || 272 || 171 || 443 || 175 || 50 || 0.2 || 0.1 || 10.9 || 6.8 || 17.7 || 7.0 || 2.0 || 2
|- 
| 2009 ||  || 36
| 25 || 2 || 6 || 290 || 183 || 473 || 208 || 34 || 0.1 || 0.2 || 11.6 || 7.3 || 18.9 || 8.3 || 1.4 || 7
|-  
| 2010 ||  || 36
| 25 || 10 || 6 || 344 || 177 || 521 || bgcolor=CAE1FF | 240† || 58 || 0.4 || 0.2 || 13.8 || 7.1 || 20.8 || bgcolor=CAE1FF | 9.6† || 2.3 || 8
|- 
| 2011 ||  || 36
| 5 || 3 || 0 || 41 || 17 || 58 || 20 || 8 || 0.6 || 0.0 || 8.2 || 3.4 || 11.6 || 4.0 || 1.6 || 0
|-  
| 2012 ||  || 36
| 20 || 4 || 7 || 261 || 82 || 343 || 160 || 30 || 0.2 || 0.4 || 13.1 || 4.1 || 17.2 || 8.0 || 1.5 || 7
|- 
| bgcolor=F0E68C | 2013# ||  || 17
| 21 || 2 || 1 || 199 || 129 || 328 || 158 || 39 || 0.1 || 0.0 || 9.5 || 6.1 || 15.6 || 7.5 || 1.9 || 0
|-  
| bgcolor=F0E68C | 2014# ||  || 17
| 11 || 0 || 1 || 80 || 73 || 153 || 61 || 12 || 0.0 || 0.1 || 7.3 || 6.6 || 13.9 || 5.5 || 1.1 || 0
|-
| bgcolor=F0E68C | 2015# ||  || 17
| 22 || 0 || 0 || 192 || 120 || 312 || 147 || 34 || 0.0 || 0.0 || 8.7 || 5.5 || 14.2 || 6.7 || 1.5 || 0
|- class="sortbottom"
! colspan=3| Career
! 251 !! 34 !! 32 !! 2360 !! 1338 !! 3698 !! 1630 !! 412 !! 0.1 !! 0.1 !! 9.4 !! 5.3 !! 14.7 !! 6.5 !! 1.6 !! 26
|}

Honours and achievements
Team
 3× AFL premiership player: 2013, 2014, 2015
 Minor premiership: 2013

Individual
 Norm Smith Medal: 2013
 2× All-Australian team: 2009, 2010
 Charles Sutton Medal: 2007
  life member

References

External links

Western Bulldogs players
Hawthorn Football Club players
Hawthorn Football Club Premiership players
Box Hill Football Club players
Charles Sutton Medal winners
1982 births
Living people
Australian rules footballers from South Australia
Woodville-West Torrens Football Club players
All-Australians (AFL)
Norm Smith Medal winners
Criminals from Melbourne
Australian people convicted of assault
People convicted of theft
Australian Survivor contestants
Three-time VFL/AFL Premiership players